This list is of the Cultural Properties of Japan designated in the category of  for the Prefecture of Yamagata.

National Cultural Properties
As of 1 July 2019, eight properties have been designated Important Cultural Properties (including one *National Treasure), being of national significance.

Prefectural Cultural Properties
As of 2 November 2018, seventy-seven properties have been designated at a prefectural level.

Municipal Cultural Properties
Properties designated at a municipal level include:

See also
 Cultural Properties of Japan
 List of National Treasures of Japan (paintings)
 Japanese painting
 List of Historic Sites of Japan (Yamagata)

References

External links
  Cultural Properties in Yamagata Prefecture

Cultural Properties,Yamagata
Cultural Properties,Paintings
Paintings,Yamagata
Lists of paintings